The following is a list of churches in the district of Huntingdonshire.

Active churches 
The district has an estimated 131 churches for 175,700 inhabitants, a ratio of one church to every 1,341 people.

There are no churches in the civil parishes of Alconbury Weston, Conington, Denton and Caldecote, Earith, Wood Walton and Wyton on the Hill.

Defunct churches

Map of medieval parish churches

Cambridgeshire

Central Cambridge

References 

Huntingdonshire
 
Lists of buildings and structures in Huntingdonshire